Agidel Ufa are a professional ice hockey team in the Zhenskaya Hockey League (ZhHL). They play in Ufa, Republic of Bashkortostan, Russia at the Ice Palace Salavat Yulaev. The team was founded in 2010 and competed in the Russian Women's Hockey League until the league was replaced by the Zhenskaya Hockey League in 2015. Agidel is one of the original teams from the inaugural season of the Zhenskaya Hockey League and have won the Russian Championship three times, in 2018, 2019, and 2021.

The team is a part of the Salavat Yulaev hockey organization, of which Salavat Yulaev Ufa of the KHL, Toros Neftekamsk of the VHL, and Tolpar Ufa of the MHL are also parts.

Players and personnel

2021–22 roster 

 

Coaching staff and team personnel
 Head coach: Denis Afinogenov
 Assistant coach: Sergei Trudakov
 Equipment manager: Ilya Sorokin

Team captaincy history 
 Yekaterina Pashkevich, 2013–14
 Anna Shibanova, 2016–17
 Yekaterina Lebedeva, 2018–2020
 Maria Pechnikova, 2020–

Head coaches 
 Vladimir Malmygin, 2015–23 December 2015
 Denis Afinogenov, 23 December 2015–

Team honours

Russian Champions 

  Zhenskaya Hockey League (3): 2018, 2019, 2021

  Runners-up (1): 2020

Notable alumni 
Years active with Agidel listed alongside player name
Yekaterina Ananina, 2014–2018
Yelena Dergachyova, 2013–14
Inna Dyubanok, 2013–2019
Anna Fagina, 2012–2017
Angelina Goncharenko, 2013–14
Alexandra Kapustina, 2015–2018
Yekaterina Lebedeva, 2014–2020
Yulia Leskina, 2015–2017
Yekaterina Smolentseva, 2016–17
Alexandra Vafina, 2017–18
Yekaterina Zakharova, 2010–2018

International players
 Jana Budajová, 2012–2015
 Fanni Gasparics, 2015–2018
 Nicol Lucák Čupková, 2011–2022
 Alena Mills, 2018–2020
 Sara O'Toole, 2011–2014
 O'Hara Shipe, 2011–12

References

External links 

 Team information and statistics from EliteProspects.com, and EuroHockey.com, and HockeyArchives.info (in French)

Women's ice hockey in Russia
Zhenskaya Hockey League teams
Sport in Ufa